Signifyin' is an album by jazz saxophonist Lou Donaldson recorded for the Argo label in 1963 and performed by Donaldson with Roy Montrell, Tommy Turrentine, Big John Patton, and Ben Dixon.

Reception
The album was awarded 4½ stars in an Allmusic review by Thom Jurek who states "Donaldson has a band that can cook whatever meat he gives them... the band keeps the beats tight, full of deep backbeat funk and raw soul... No matter how you add it up, the only complaint about these six tracks that can justifiably be mustered is that there weren't more".

Track listing
All compositions by Lou Donaldson except where noted
 "Signifyin'" - 7:07  
 "Time After Time" (Sammy Cahn, Jule Styne) - 2:35  
 "Si Si Safronia" - 5:38  
 "Don't Get Around Much Anymore" (Duke Ellington, Bob Russell) - 3:53  
 "I Feel It in My Bones" - 8:15  
 "Coppin' a Plea" - 4:09

Personnel
Lou Donaldson - alto saxophone
Tommy Turrentine - trumpet - except track 2 
Roy Montrell - guitar 
Big John Patton - organ 
Ben Dixon - drums

References

Lou Donaldson albums
1963 albums
Albums produced by Esmond Edwards
Argo Records albums